Wooldridge Park, also known as Wooldridge Square, is an urban park in downtown Austin, Texas. The park consists of a city block containing a natural basin whose sides slope inward to form an amphitheater with a bandstand at its center. The park was added to the National Register of Historic Places in 1979.

History
Wooldridge Park is one of four original public squares designated in downtown Austin in the 1839 Waller Plan for the city drawn up by Edwin Waller, but it lay vacant for seventy years. In an era of civic pride in 1909, however, Austin Mayor A. P. Wooldridge sponsored the cleaning of the square and the construction of a classical revival-style gazebo for public engagements, which officially opened the same year. The park was dedicated on June 18, 1909 to considerable aplomb with dedicatory address being made by the Mayor. 

Wooldridge Park is the only one of the original public squares to have retained its original function; the other three underwent various uses over time, hosting parking lots, a fire station, a church, a museum, and businesses.

The view of the Texas State Capitol from Wooldridge Park is one of the Capitol View Corridors protected under state and local law from obstruction by tall buildings since 1983.

References

External links

Parks in Austin, Texas
National Register of Historic Places in Austin, Texas
Parks on the National Register of Historic Places in Texas
Amphitheaters on the National Register of Historic Places
Amphitheaters in Texas
Event venues on the National Register of Historic Places in Texas
1909 establishments in Texas
City of Austin Historic Landmarks